A cowboy is a professional pastoralist or mounted livestock herder, usually from the Americas or Australia.

Cowboy(s) or The Cowboy(s) may also refer to:

Film and television
Cowboy (1958 film), starring Glenn Ford
Cowboy (1966 film), a documentary
The Cowboys, a 1972 Western film starring John Wayne
Cowboy (2013 film), a Malayalam film starring Asif Ali and Bala
Cowboys (2013 film), a Croatian film
Les Cowboys, a 2015 French-Belgian drama film
Cowboys (2020 film), an American film
The Cowboys (TV series), a 1974 series based on the 1972 film
Cowboys (TV series), a British TV sitcom
"Cowboy" (M*A*S*H), a 1972 episode of M*A*S*H
Cowboy, a fictional gang member in The Warriors, a 1979 film and later video game

Groups
Cochise County Cowboys, an outlaw gang which participated in the Gunfight at the OK Corral
Cowboys, a group of Loyalist irregulars during the American Revolution led by Claudius Smith

Music
 Cowboy (band), an American country rock band
Cowboy Records, an American record label
Cowboy (album), by Erasure, 1997
"Cowboy" (Kid Rock song), 1999
"Cowboy" (Ch!pz song), 2003
"Cowboy", a song by Billy Crawford from Big City
"Cowboy", a song by Bow Wow Wow from See Jungle! See Jungle! Go Join Your Gang Yeah, City All Over! Go Ape Crazy!
"Cowboy", a song by f(x) from the single "4 Walls"
"Cowboy", a song by Jon Spencer Blues Explosion from Orange
"Cowboy", a song by Lindemann from Skills in Pills
"Cowboy", a song by Randy Newman from Randy Newman
"Cowboy", a song by The Sugarcubes from Life's Too Good
"Cowboy", a song by Tyler, the Creator from Wolf
"Cowboys", a song by Slayyyter from Troubled Paradise

Sports teams
Alpine Cowboys, an American baseball team
Calgary Cowboys, a U.S.–Canadian ice hockey franchise
Dallas Cowboys, an American football team
McNeese State Cowboys, the men's athletic teams of McNeese State University
Munich Cowboys, an American football team
New Mexico Highlands Cowboys, the men's athletic teams of New Mexico Highlands University
North Queensland Cowboys, an Australian rugby league team
Oklahoma State Cowboys, the men's athletic teams of Oklahoma State University - Stillwater
Wyoming Cowboys, the men's athletic teams of the University of Wyoming

People with the nickname
Tommy Anderson (ice hockey) (1910–1971), Canadian National Hockey League player
Howard Blatchford (1912–1943), Canadian World War II flying ace
Jeff Brantley (born 1963), American baseball player and broadcaster
Neal Cassady (1926–1968), American Beat poet
Donald Cerrone (born 1983), American MMA fighter
Jack Clement (1931–2013), American singer, songwriter and record and film producer
Herbert Coward (born 1938), American actor
James Dahlman (1856–1930), American politician
Leroy Edwards (1914–1971), American basketball player
Cowboy Morgan Evans (1903–1969), American rodeo cowboy and oil field worker
Bill Flett (1943–1999), Canadian National Hockey League player
Curt Gowdy (1919–2006), American sportscaster
Cowboy Hill (American football) (1899–1966), American football player
Cowboy Jones (1874–1958), American baseball player
John McCormack (boxer) (1935–2014), Scottish boxer
Cowboy Jimmy Moore (1910–1999), American pocket billiards player
Kevin Neale (born 1945), Australian footballer
Cowboy Troy (born 1970), American country rapper
Cowboy Slim Rinehart (1911–1948), American singer and radio broadcaster
Cowboy Saunders (1928–2006), South African rugby union player
Cowboy Wheeler (1898–1939), American football player and an original member of the Green Bay Packers
Byron Wolford (1930–2003), American rodeo cowboy and poker player

People with the ring name
Cowboy Lang, midget professional wrestler Harry Lang (1950–2007)
Alex Oliveira (fighter) (born 1988), Brazilian UFC fighter
Bob Orton Jr. (born 1950), American professional wrestler

People with the stage name
Cowboy Copas, American country music singer Lloyd Copas (1913–1963) 
Keef Cowboy and Cowboy, stage names of Keith Wiggins (1960–1989), American hip hop artist and member of Grandmaster Flash and the Furious Five

Other uses
Cowboy Mountain, Washington, United States
Joe West (umpire) (born 1952), American baseball umpire nicknamed "Cowboy Joe"
Cowboy (comics), a Marvel Comics character
Cowboy (sex position), a type anal sex between two men
Cowboy (cocktail), a Prohibition-era cocktail made with whiskey and cream
Cowboy pool or just cowboy, a hybrid pool game
Cowboys (Heroscape), a type of hero in the wargame Heroscape
Cowboy, a 2014 novel by Finnish writer Reijo Mäki
Cowboy, a concept pickup by American Motors based on the AMC Hornet

See also

Cowboy or open chord, in music
Cowgirl (disambiguation)

Lists of people by nickname